Absent in melanoma 1 protein is a protein that in humans is encoded by the AIM1 gene.

References

External links
 
 PDBe-KB provides an overview of all the structure information available in the PDB for Human Beta/gamma crystallin domain-containing protein 1 (AIM1)

Further reading